The Ministry of Economy and Foreign Trade of Syria is the ministry that is responsible of drawing the state's economic policy in general and trade policy in particular. It was established in 2003 and again in 2012 as a replacement to the Ministry of Economy and Foreign Trade and the Ministry of Supply and Internal Trade.

Ministry departments
 Directorates of Economy in the Governorates.
 Governorate domestic trade directorates.
 Central Administration.

Ministers of Economy and Foreign Trade
Abdul Karim Zuhoor (1963)
George Tohme (1963-1964)
Kamal Hosni (1964)
Ibrahim al-Bitar (1964-1965)
Kamal Hosni (1965-1966)
Ahmed Murad (1966-1968)
Zuhair al-Khani (1968-1970)
Mustafa Hallaj (1970-1972)
Muhammad al-Imadi (1972-1980)
Muhammad al-Atrash (1980-1981)
Salim Said Yasin (1981–1985)
Muhammad al-Imadi (7 April 1985 - 13 December 2001)
Ghassan Al Rifai (13 December 2001 – 4 October 2004)
Amer Husni Lutfi (4 October 2004 – 19 January 2010)
Lamia Assi (19 January 2010 – 29 March 2011)
Mohammad Nidal al-Shaar (14 April 2011 – 23 June 2012)
Mohamed Dhafer Mahbek (23 June 2012 - 22 August 2013)
Humam Al Jazaeri (22 August 2013 - 3 July 2016)
Adeeb Mayala (3 July 2016 - 29 March 2017)
Mohammad Samer al-Khalil (29 March 2017 - incumbent)

See also 

 Economy of Syria

References

External links
 Ministry of Economy and Trade Official Website (Arabic) (English)

2003 establishments in Syria
Syria
Syria
Economy
Ministries established in 2003
Organizations based in Damascus